A list of officials of the Republic of Texas, 1836–1846:

First elected government of the Texas Republic
(October 22, 1836 to December 10, 1838)

President
Sam Houston

Vice-President
Mirabeau B. Lamar

Secretary of State
Stephen F. Austin
James P. Henderson
Robert Anderson Irion

Secretary of War
Thomas Jefferson Rusk
  William S. Fisher
Barnard E. Bee
Albert Sidney Johnston

Secretary of the Navy
Samuel Rhoads Fisher
William M. Shepherd

Secretary of Treasury
Henry Smith

Attorney General
James Collinsworth
James P. Henderson
Peter W. Grayson
John Birdsall

Postmaster General
Gustavus A. Parker
Robert Barr

Commissioner of Land Office
John P. Borden

Second elected government of the Texas Republic
(December 10, 1838 through December 13, 1841)

President
Mirabeau B. Lamar

Vice-President
David G. Burnet

Secretary of State
Barnard E. Bee
James Webb
Nathaniel C. Armory
David G. Burnet
Abner Smith Lipscomb
James S. Mayfield

Secretary of War
Albert Sidney Johnston
Branch Tanner Archer

Secretary of the Navy
Memucan Hunt
Louis P. Cooke

Secretary of Treasury
Richard G. Dunlap
James Harper Starr
James W. Simmons
J.G. Chalmers
James Webb

Attorney General
John C. Watrous
James Webb
Francis Asbury Morris

Postmaster General
Robert Barr
Elijah Sterling Clack Robertson
John Rice Jones, Jr.

Land Commissioner
John P. Borden
H. W. Raglin
Thomas William Ward

Third elected government of the Texas Republic
(December 13, 1841 through December 9, 1844)

President
Sam Houston

Vice-President
Edward Burleson

Secretary of State
Anson Jones

Secretary of War & Marine
George Washington Hockley
Morgan C. Hamilton
George Washington Hill

Secretary of Treasury
E. Lawrence Stickney
William Henry Daingerfield
James B. Miller

Attorney General
George W. Terrell

Land Commissioner
Thomas W. Ward

Fourth elected government of the Texas Republic
(December 9, 1844 to February 19, 1846 when Texas entered the Union)

President
Anson Jones

Vice-President
Kenneth L. Anderson

Secretary of State
Ebenezer Allen
Ashbel Smith

Secretary of War & Marine
George Washington Hill
Morgan C. Hamilton
William Gordon Cooke

Attorney General
Ebenezer Allen
William Beck Ochiltree

Secretary of Treasury
William Beck Ochiltree
John A. Greer

Land Commissioner
Thomas W. Ward

References 

People of the Republic of Texas
Presidents of the Republic of Texas
Vice presidents of the Republic of Texas
Lists of Texas politicians